Ferdinand "Ferd" Wirtz (26 November 1885 – 18 April 1947) was a Luxembourgian gymnast who competed in the 1912 Summer Olympics. He was born in Luxembourg City. In 1912 he was a member of the Luxembourgian team which finished fourth in the team, European system competition and fifth in the team, free system event.

References

External links
 Sports Reference profile
 List of Luxembourgian gymnasts

1885 births
1947 deaths
Sportspeople from Luxembourg City
Luxembourgian male artistic gymnasts
Olympic gymnasts of Luxembourg
Gymnasts at the 1912 Summer Olympics
20th-century Luxembourgian people